The 1956 Scottish Cup Final in association football was played on 21 April 1956 at Hampden Park in Glasgow and was the final of the 71st staging of the Scottish Cup. Hearts and Celtic contested the match. The match was won 3-1 by Hearts.

Final

Teams

See also
Played between same clubs:
1901 Scottish Cup Final
1907 Scottish Cup Final
2019 Scottish Cup Final
2020 Scottish Cup Final

External links
SFA report 
 Video highlights from official Pathé News archive

1956
Scottish Cup Final
Scottish Cup Final 1956
Scottish Cup Final 1956
1950s in Glasgow
Scottish Cup Final